The small-footed shrew (Crocidura parvipes) is a species of mammal in the family Soricidae. It is found in Angola, Burundi, Cameroon, Central African Republic, Chad, Democratic Republic of the Congo, Ethiopia, Kenya, Nigeria, Rwanda, South Sudan, Tanzania, Uganda, and Zambia. Its natural habitats are subtropical or tropical moist lowland forest and shrubland.

References
 Hutterer, R., Baxter, R. & Howell, K. 2004.  Crocidura parvipes.   2006 IUCN Red List of Threatened Species.   Downloaded on 30 July 2007.

Crocidura
Mammals described in 1910
Taxonomy articles created by Polbot